HMS Restoration was a 70-gun third rate ship of the line of the Royal Navy, built by Joseph Allin the elder at Deptford Dockyard and launched on 1 August 1706, after the previous  had been lost in the Great Storm of 1703.

This ship also had a premature end when she was wrecked off Livorno on 9 November 1711.

Notes

References

 
 Lavery, Brian (2003) The Ship of the Line - Volume 1: The development of the battlefleet 1650-1850. Conway Maritime Press. .

Ships of the line of the Royal Navy
1700s ships